David Paetz (born 1 May 1940) is a New Zealand cricketer. He played in one first-class match for Wellington in 1966/67.

See also
 List of Wellington representative cricketers

References

External links
 

1940 births
Living people
New Zealand cricketers
Wellington cricketers
Cricketers from Wellington City